Ardez is a former municipality in the district of Inn in the canton of Graubünden in eastern Switzerland. The village is located in the Lower Engadin valley.  On 1 January 2015 the former municipalities of Ardez, Guarda, Tarasp, Ftan and Sent merged into the municipality of Scuol.

History
Ardez is first mentioned in 840 as Ardezis.  In to the 19th century it was known by the German name of Steinsberg.

Geography

Of this area, 29.7% is used for agricultural purposes, while 20% is forested. Of the rest of the land, 0.8% is settled (buildings or roads) and the remainder (49.5%) is non-productive (rivers, glaciers or mountains).

The former municipality is located in the Sur Tasna sub-district of the Inn district, with the village on the left bank of the Inn river.  It consists of the village of Ardez and the hamlets of Bos-cha and Sur En.

Demographics

Ardez had a population (as of 2014) of 427.  , 9.8% of the population was made up of foreign nationals.  Over the last 10 years the population has grown at a rate of 0.5%.

, the gender distribution of the population was 52.0% male and 48.0% female.  The age distribution, in Ardez is; 48 children or 12.0% of the population are between 0 and 9 years old.  23 teenagers or 5.7% are 10 to 14, and 23 teenagers or 5.7% are 15 to 19.  Of the adult population, 40 people or 10.0% of the population are between 20 and 29 years old.  55 people or 13.7% are 30 to 39, 54 people or 13.5% are 40 to 49, and 58 people or 14.5% are 50 to 59.  The senior population distribution is 35 people or 8.7% of the population are between 60 and 69 years old, 42 people or 10.5% are 70 to 79, there are 20 people or 5.0% who are 80 to 89, and there are 3 people or 0.7% who are 90 to 99.

In the 2007 federal election the most popular party was the SVP which received 47.3% of the vote.  The next three most popular parties were the SPS (29.8%), the FDP (13.8%) and the CVP (7.2%).

In Ardez about 70% of the population (between age 25-64) have completed either non-mandatory upper secondary education or additional higher education (either university or a Fachhochschule).

Ardez has an unemployment rate of 1.08%.  , there were 40 people employed in the primary economic sector and about 19 businesses involved in this sector.  33 people are employed in the secondary sector and there are 7 businesses in this sector.  49 people are employed in the tertiary sector, with 15 businesses in this sector.

The historical population is given in the following table:

 Population increase during railway construction.

Languages
Most of the population speaks Rhaeto-Romance (73.8%), with German  being second most common (20.2%) and Italian being third ( 3.0%).
The majority of the population speak the Vallader dialect of Romansh.  Romansh is taught in the village school and spoken in the municipality.  Until 1900 the municipality was nearly Romansh only (1880 94%, 1900 94%).  The majority dropped throughout the 20th Century (1941 84%, 1980 83%).  The modern situation with languages is given in the following table:

Heritage sites of national significance

The Chasté (a prehistoric site, a medieval fortress and a church) and the Doppelwohnhaus (Double-house) with barn are listed as Swiss heritage sites of national significance.

The Chastè site includes settlements from the late Bronze Age (Melauner culture) into the early Iron Age (Fritzens-Sanzeno culture) as well as some finds from the Roman Empire.

Photo gallery Ruina chanoua at Ardez

References

External links
Official website
Pictures of Ardez

Scuol
Former municipalities of Graubünden
Cultural property of national significance in Graubünden
Populated places disestablished in 2015